Cerro Gordo is a former settlement in Butte County, California, United States, and was primarily a silver mining town based around the Cerro Gordo Mines. At its height, hundreds of dwellings dotted the landscape, while miners sought their fortunes.

History

Cerro Gordo ("Fat Hill" in Spanish) got its name from Mexicans, who regularly searched the area for silver. Mining officially began in 1865 after its discovery by Pablo Flores; by 1867 the word had spread, and scores of prospectors had arrived seeking fortune.  In 1866, local businessman Victor Beaudry had opened a store, as well as acquiring several mining claims, including partial interest to the lucrative Union Mine. By 1869, Cerro Gordo was the largest producer of silver and lead in the nation; teams of mules would travel between Cerro Gordo and Los Angeles, California. In its peak, the town was home to several mines, hundreds of structures (most were of the ramshackle variety), bars, a general store, and hotel. The isolated nature of the town led to much lawlessness, as gunfights were recorded in its time. 

The prosperity of Cerro Gordo was short lived; by 1877 a fire raged throughout the mines, burning down much of the infrastructure. Falling silver and lead prices were the final straw, and most of the inhabitants left as quickly as they came. The town briefly came back to life for a few decades, starting in 1905, as it was used for zinc processing. The town was left mostly abandoned, save for a few caretakers who stayed behind. In 2018, the town was purchased for 1.4 million dollars by several marketers who intended to develop it into a tourist attraction, however some of the structures, including the American Hotel burned down in June 2020 in a suspected electrical fire.

Accessibility
Cerro Gordo is accessible by an 8-mile dirt utility road; use of a 4WD vehicle is recommended, but the road can be navigated in a 2WD vehicle.

See also
 Cerro Gordo Mines

References

External links
 Cerro Gordo Mines

Former settlements in Inyo County, California
Former populated places in California
Ghost towns in California